When an atom has more than one electron there will be some electrostatic repulsion between those electrons. The amount of repulsion varies from atom to atom, depending upon the number and spin of the electrons and the orbitals they occupy. The total repulsion can be expressed in terms of three parameters A, B and C which are known as the Racah parameters after Giulio Racah, who first described them. They are generally obtained empirically from gas-phase spectroscopic studies of atoms.

They are often used in transition-metal chemistry to describe the repulsion energy associated with an electronic term. For example, the interelectronic repulsion of a 3P term is A + 7B, and of a 3F term is A - 8B, and the difference between them is therefore 15B.

Definition 

The Racah parameters are defined as

where  are Slater integrals

where  is the normalized radial part of an electron orbital,  and 
.

See also 
 Tanabe–Sugano diagram
 Nephelauxetic effect

References

External links
 Multiplets in Transition Metal Ions in E. Pavarini, E. Koch, F. Anders, and M. Jarrell (eds.): Correlated Electrons: From Models to Materials, Jülich 2012, 

Coordination chemistry
Spectroscopy